Shambuko Subregion is a subregion in the western Gash-Barka region (Zoba Gash-Barka) of Eritrea. Its capital lies at Shambuko.

History
The town and district was overrun by Ethiopia during the Eritrean-Ethiopian War when the population fled.

Towns and villages
Badme
Shambuko

References
Awate.com: Martyr Statistics

Subregions of Eritrea